Who's to Bless and Who's to Blame is the sixth solo album by Kris Kristofferson, released in 1975 on Monument Records. Its title track is quoted in the Johnny Cash song "The Man Comes Around" from the 2002 album of the same name. The song "Stranger" was covered as a duet by Johnny Duncan and Janie Fricke, and their version reached #4 on the U.S. country chart in 1976.

Background
Although Kristofferson’s recording career took a dip with the disappointing Spooky Lady Sideshow, his acting career continued to ascend; after starring in Sam Peckinpah’s Pat Garret and Billy the Kid, he was cast in a supporting role in Martin Scorsese’s Alice Doesn’t Live Here Anymore, which was a smash hit in 1975 and grossed more than $17 million nationwide.  Some pointed to Kristofferson’s increased interest in acting as the reason for the decline in his musical success, a sentiment echoed when music publisher Bob Beckham cracked that the singer might want to go back to flying helicopters down to the Gulf Coast, where he had written some of his early famous songs. Kristofferson later stated he was sure “there were some people that really started to get critical of what I was doing.  It was as if I were spending so much creative energy on the wrong thing, performing and movies, that my songwriting was suffering. I don’t think it was.  I don’t think I’d have done better if I’d been down there in the Gulf still.  And certainly, the rest of my life was an exciting thing.”  By 1975, the outlaw country movement exploded with the release of Willie Nelson’s Red Headed Stranger, as well as with a string of successful LPs by Waylon Jennings, including the seminal album Honky Tonk Heroes.  Although Kristofferson helped as much as any artist to sow the seeds of this new genre, which offered deeper, realistic lyrics rooted in pure country with a rock and roll attitude, Who’s to Bless and Who’s to Blame continued his commercial decline that had started with 1974’s Spooky Lady Sideshow.

Recording and composition
The album was recorded at Sunset Sound in Los Angeles with producer David Anderle, who Kristofferson first worked with on Full Moon, his first collaboration with wife Rita Coolidge.  Anderle cut the number of musicians so that there was a smaller palette of sounds, and Mike Utley once more made a major contribution to the overall sound and feel, predominantly laid-back and down-tempo, as did Jerry McGee with some tasteful guitar and dobro. As Streissguth writes:

Thematically, the album grapples with the subject of mortality, offering no easy answers but rather asking questions, making the essential point that there are no simple solutions to most moral conundrums. Two songs, "Don’t Cuss the Fiddle" and "The Year 2003 Minus 25", would appear on Waylon Jennings and Willie Nelson’s 1978 duet album, the latter foreshadowing Kristofferson’s increasing political awareness and activism in the coming decade. "Rocket to Superstardom" was inspired by the practice of some aspiring singers who would sing at the security cameras outside Kristofferson’s Malibu home in the forlorn hope that he or Coolidge would be sold enough to record their songs. (Interestingly, Kristofferson is said to have done the same thing, landing a helicopter on Johnny Cash’s property in the late sixties in hopes of giving the country star a few of his demos.)  Another recurring theme in Kristofferson’s songs – the debasement of women – is addressed again in "Easy, Come On".

Reception
Although Johnny Duncan would score a Top 5 country hit with "Stranger", Who’s to Bless and Who’s to Blame was not a commercial success, and radio ignored the single "The Year 2000 Minus 25".  Kristofferson biographer Stephen Miller contends "When not derivative – "If It’s All the Same to You" bore a strong resemblance to "Once More with Feeling" – the melodies were generally unmemorable".

Track listing
All songs composed by Kris Kristofferson; except as noted
"The Year 2000 Minus 25" – 3:38
"If It's All the Same to You" – 3:14
"Easy, Come On" – 3:35
"Stallion" – 4:44
"Rocket to Stardom" (Kristofferson, Roger McGuinn, Bob Neuwirth) – 3:33
"Stranger" – 3:07
"Who's to Bless and Who's to Blame" – 3:32
"Don't Cuss the Fiddle" – 3:21
"Silver (The Hunger)" – 8:14

Personnel
Kris Kristofferson - vocals, 12 and 6 string guitars
Jerry McGee - electric and acoustic guitars, Dobro
Fred Tackett - acoustic guitar, mandolin
Michael Utley - keyboards, Moog synthesizer
Leland Sklar - bass
Sammy Creason - drums
Bobbye Hall - percussion, congas
Nick DeCaro - accordion
Clydie King - background vocals
Venetta Fields - background vocals
Rita Coolidge - background vocals
Billy Swan - background vocals
Terry Paul - background vocals
Herb Pedersen - background vocals
Mentor Williams - background vocals
The 'Rocket to Stardom' Chorus: Billy, Terry, Herb, Mike, Donnie Fritts, Warren Oates

Production
Produced by David Anderle
Recording Engineers: John Haeny, Kent Nebergall, Wayne Dailey
Mixing Engineer: David Anderle
Recorded at Sunset Sound Studios, Los Angeles, California
Mastered at The Mastering Lab, Los Angeles, California

Charts

References

Bibliography

1975 albums
Kris Kristofferson albums
Albums produced by David Anderle
Monument Records albums
Albums recorded at Sunset Sound Recorders